The 2012 Uzbek League season was the 21st season of top level football in Uzbekistan since independence in 1992. Bunyodkor were the defending champions from the 2011 campaign.
The draw for the 2012 Uzbek League season took place on January 6, 2012.

FK Guliston was officially out of the season, and was replaced by Qizilqum Zarafshon, the reason for absence were financial problems of the club.

New rules
- The 4+1 format of foreign players has been reduced to 3+1.

Teams
Qizilqum Zarafshon and Sogdiana Jizzakh were relegated in the last edition of the Uzbek League to First League.

Managerial changes

Foreign players

 Foreign players who left their clubs after first half of the season.

Pre-season transfers

League table

Results

Top goalscorers
See also Coach and Player of Month

Last updated: 21 November 2012
Source: Soccerway

See also
 Uzbekistan Footballer of the Year
 Uzbek League Top Scorer

References

External links
Uzbek League
Championat.uz: Standings and Results

Uzbekistan Super League seasons
1
Uzbek
Uzbek